The Texas Rangers 1972 season involved the Rangers finishing sixth in the American League West with a record of 54 wins and 100 losses. This was the Rangers' first season in Texas, as well as the club's first year in the AL West, after playing their first 11 seasons in Washington, D.C., and from 1969 to 1971 in the American League East. The Rangers were dead last in batting in the major leagues with a .217 team batting average. They failed to record an extra-base hit in 38 of their 154 games, the most of any team in the live-ball era (1920 onwards).

Offseason 
 December 2, 1971: Bernie Allen was traded by the Rangers to the New York Yankees for Terry Ley and Gary Jones.
 December 2, 1971: Del Unser, Gary Jones, Terry Ley, and Denny Riddleberger were traded by the Rangers to the Cleveland Indians for Roy Foster, Ken Suarez, Mike Paul, and Rich Hand.
 December 2, 1971: Paul Casanova was traded by the Rangers to the Atlanta Braves for Hal King.
 March 4, 1972: Denny McLain was traded by the Rangers to the Oakland Athletics for Jim Panther and Don Stanhouse.
 March 7, 1972: Tim Cullen was released by the Rangers.
 Prior to 1972 season: Lew Beasley was acquired by the Rangers from the Baltimore Orioles.

Regular season 

On April 15, 1972, the Rangers played their first American League game against the California Angels on the road at Anaheim Stadium.  The Angels' Andy Messersmith hurled a complete-game, two-hit shutout, and the Rangers fell, 1–0.  Toby Harrah and Hal King had their only hits, both singles, but catcher King made two errors. His second miscue led to the Angels' winning run in the bottom of the ninth inning. Dick Bosman was the hard-luck loser.

The first game in Texas 
On April 21, 1972, the Rangers' first game in Texas came six days later at Arlington Stadium against the Angels before 20,105 spectators. This time, Bosman emerged triumphant as the Rangers built a 6–1 lead and hung on to win their home opener, 7–6. Frank Howard and Dave Nelson each homered for Texas, while Lenny Randle and Harrah each collected three hits. Harrah scored three runs, and Randle notched four runs batted in.

Opening Day starters, April 15, 1972

Season standings

Record vs. opponents

Notable transactions 
 June 6, 1972: 1972 Major League Baseball Draft
Brian Doyle was drafted by the Rangers in the 4th round.
Jim Sundberg was drafted by the Rangers in the 8th round, but did not sign.
 July 20, 1972: Don Mincher and Ted Kubiak were traded by the Rangers to the Oakland Athletics for Marty Martínez, Vic Harris and a player to be named later.
 August 31, 1972: Frank Howard was purchased from the Rangers by the Detroit Tigers.
 September 7, 1972: Rich Hinton was purchased by the Rangers from the New York Yankees.

Roster

Player stats

Batting

Starters by position 
Note: Pos = Position; G = Games played; AB = At bats; R = Runs scored; H = Hits; Avg. = Batting average; HR = Home runs; RBI = Runs batted in; SB = Stolen bases

Other batters 
Note: G = Games played; AB = At bats; R = Runs scored; H = Hits; Avg. = Batting average; HR = Home runs; RBI = Runs batted in; SB = Stolen bases

Pitching

Starting pitchers 
Note: G = Games pitched; IP = Innings pitched; W = Wins; L = Losses; ERA = Earned run average; SO = Strikeouts

Other pitchers 
Note: G = Games pitched; IP = Innings pitched; W = Wins; L = Losses; ERA = Earned run average; SO = Strikeouts

Relief pitchers 
Note: G = Games pitched; W = Wins; L = Losses; SV = Saves; ERA = Earned run average; SO = Strikeouts

Farm system

Notes

References 

1972 Texas Rangers team page at Baseball Reference
1972 Texas Rangers team page at www.baseball-almanac.com

Texas Rangers seasons
Texas Rangers season
Inaugural Major League Baseball seasons by team
Washing